is a Japanese film released in 2015, directed by Kobayashi Shotaro. Maestro! stars Toshiyuki Nishida as Tendō and Tori Matsuzaka as Kōsaka and Miwa with Nobuyuki Tsujii and Yutaka Sado. The film featured as part of the LA Eiga Festival

Plot 

An orchestra is reformed, after initially having been disbanded because of money. The group is reformed by a mysterious benefactor, whose management style annoys many of the players. The film is adopted from the popular manga of the same name.

The story centres around the young violinist, Kosaka, who is offered a position in the re-formed prestigious orchestra. However, he is surprised to discover that the rehearsal place is a disused factory and performances of the members is somewhat erratic, as the majority of the best players have found positions elsewhere.  Amid the chaos, conductor Tendo Tetsusaburo (played by Toshiyuki Nishida ) arrives. The movie explores the relationships between the individual players, friction heightened between them based on their work ethics and egos. Some of the professional egos creates drama, particularly when an amateur (though gifted)flute player, Amane Tachibana  (played by singer/songwriter Miwa) arrives. With the orchestra facing continuing financial problems, the erratic conductor continues to push the orchestra, and despite his abnormal ways, starts to get results.

Cast 
 Toshiyuki Nishida as Tendō 
 Tori Matsuzaka as Kōsaka
 Miwa
 Nobuyuki Tsujii 
 Yutaka Sad

References

External links 
 
 Eigapedia https://eigapedia.com/movie/maestro

2010s Japanese films
Films about classical music and musicians
2010s Japanese-language films